The Azd, or Al-Azd, are a tribe of Sabaean Arabs.

In ancient times, the Sabaeans inhabited Ma'rib, capital city of the Kingdom of Saba' in modern-day Yemen. Their lands were irrigated by the Ma'rib Dam, which is thought by some to have been one of the engineering wonders of the ancient world because of its size. When the dam collapsed for the third time in the 1st century C.E., much of the Azd tribe left Marib and dispersed; Azd Shanū’ah (Zahran & Ghamid) inhabited the Sarawat Mountains in Hejaz; Bariq inhabited Tihamah; and Azd Mazin (Al Ansar & Ghassanids) inhabited two different regions, where the Ansaris settled in Medina, Hejaz , while the Ghassanids settled in the far north of the Arabian Peninsula.

Genetic Studies and Anthropology

Genetic studies and research indicate that Azdite tribes belong to a genealogy that hails from the far north of the Arabian Peninsula, specifically from the Fertile Crescent region.

Branches 
In the 3rd century C.E., the Azd branched into four sub-branches, each led by one of the sons of Amr bin Muzaikiyya.

Imran Bin Amr 
Imran bin Amr and the bulk of the tribe went to Oman, where they established the Azdi presence in Eastern Arabia. Later they invaded Karaman and Shiraz in Southern Persia, and these came to be known as "Azd Daba". Another branch headed west back to Yemen, and a group went further west all the way to Tihamah on the Red Sea. This group was to become known as "Azd Uman" after the emergence of Islam.

Jafna bin Amr 
Jafna bin Amr and his family headed for Syria, where he settled and initiated the kingdom of the Ghassanids. They were so named after a spring of water where they stopped on their way to Syria. This branch was to produce:

 The Ghassanid dynasty in Syria
 A Roman Emperor (Philip the Arab, a Ghassanid Arab from Syria, who ruled 244–249 C.E.)
 A Byzantine dynasty (the Byzantine Emperor Leo III the Isaurian, also known as the "Syrian", ruled from 717 to 741 C.E.)

Thalabah bin Amr 
Thalabah bin Amr left his tribe for the Hijaz, and dwelt between Thalabiyah and Dhi Qar. When he gained strength, he headed for Yathrib, where he stayed. Of his seed are the Aws and Khazraj, sons of Haritha bin Thalabah. These were to be the Muslim Ansar and were to produce the last Arab dynasty in Spain (the Nasrids).

Haritha bin Amr 
Haritha bin Amr led a branch of the Azd Qahtani tribes. He wandered with his tribe in the Hijaz until they came to the Tihamah. He had three sons Adi, Afsa and Lahi. Adiy was the father of Bariq, Lahi the father of Khuza'a and Afsa, the father of Aslam.

                              Azd
                                |                     
                 .--------------+------------.                        
                 |                           |                      
               Mazin                     Shahnvah
                 |                           |                  
      .----------+----------.       .--------+-----------.           
      |          |          |       |        |           |
      |          |          |       |        |           |
      |          |          |    Samala  (Banu) Daws   Haddan
 Thalabah     Haritha     Jafna
      |          |    (Ghassanids/The Ghassinids)
   .--+----.     |
   |       |     |_
(Banu) Aws  (Banu) Khuza'a/Khazraj |
                                   |
                         .-----+---+----------.
                         |         |          |
                        Adi       Afsa      Lohay
                         |         |          |
                       Bariq     Aslam  (Banu) Khuza'a
                                   |          |
                                Salaman   Mustalik

Zahran 

The Zahran tribe is an ancient Arabian offshoot of the Azdi tribe. According to Arab scholars, the dialect used by the Hejazi tribes, the Zahran and the Ghamid, is the closest to classical Arabic.

Azd 'Uman 
The Azd 'Uman were the dominant Arab tribe in the eastern realms of the Caliphate and were the driving force in the conquest of Fars, Makran and Sindh. They were the chief merchant group of Oman and Al-Ubulla, who organized a trading diaspora with settlements of Persianized Arabians on the coasts of Kirman and Makran, extending into Sindh since the days of Ardashir. They were strongly involved in the western trade with India, and with the expansion of the Muslim conquests, they began to consolidate their commercial and political authority on the eastern frontier. During the early years of the Muslim conquests, the Azdi ports of Bahrain and Oman were staging grounds for Muslim naval fleets headed to Fars (Persia) and Hind (India). From 637 C.E., the conquests of Fars and Makran were dominated by the Azdi and allied tribes from Oman. Between 665 and 683 C.E., the Azdi 'Uman became especially prominent due in Basra on account of favors from Ziyad ibn Abihi, the Governor of Muawiya I, and his son Ubaidullah. When a member of their tribe Abu Said Al- Muhallab ibn Abi Sufra became governor their influence and wealth increased as he extended Muslim conquests to Makran and Sindh, where so many other Azdi were settled. After his death in 702, though, they lost their grip on power with the rise of Al-Hajjaj ibn Yusuf as governor of Iraq. Al-Hajjaj pursued a systematic policy of breaking Umayyad power, as a result of which the Azd also suffered. With the death of Hajjaj and under Sulayman ibn Abd al-Malik as Caliph, their fortunes reversed once again, with the appointment of Yazid ibn al-Muhallab.

Influential people or branches 
The Ghassanids 
The Banu Tanukh
Banu Ma'an (part of the Tanukhi tribal Confederation)
The Nasrid dynasty of Al-Andalus
Al Said dynasty of Oman
Bani Yas
Al Nahyan dynasty of Abu Dhabi in what is now the U.A.E.
Al Maktoum dynasty of Dubai
Abu Dawood, collector of ahadith
Ibn Duraid
Kuthayyir, Arab poet
Jābir ibn Zayd, the co-founder of the Ibadi sect of Islam
Tribe of Balgarn (Al Garni) or ( Al-Qarni)
Ghamid
The Al Ayad tribe (Ayad) or (Ayadah) from the Northern Nile Delta and the north western Sinai Peninsula of Egypt with the Haplogroup J1
Second wife of Prince Ali Kamal Pasha son of H.H. Prince Mustafa Fazıl Pasha of Egypt, Princess Salha Zainab Ayad
Bani Shehr
Zahran
The Rawadids
Tribe of Bariq
Jabir ibn Hayyan (historicity uncertain; may also have been a non-Arab  or 'client' of the Azd)
Hudhayfah al-Bariqi
Khalil ibn Ahmad
Urwah al-Bariqi
Arfaja al-Bariqi
Humaydah al-Bariqi
Ibn Al-Thahabi
Ibn al-Banna
Jamilah bint Adwan
Asma bint Adiy al-Bariqiyyah
Al Muhallab ibn Abi Suffrah
Mu'aqqir
Fatimah bint Sa'd
Suraqah al-Bariqi
Ibn Al-Thahabi
Banu Khazraj
Billasmar (Al-Asmari)
Jamilah bint Adwan
Balahmer (Al-Ahmari)
Bani Amr (Al-Amri)
Amr ibn Khalid
Umm al-Khair
Al-Dawasir
Bani Malik
Al-Tahawi
Al-Fadl ibn Shadhan of Nishapur, Iran

See also 
 Adnanite Ishamelite Arabs
 Tribes of Arabia

References

Sources used

Further reading

External links 

 https://web.archive.org/web/20150606022930/http://www.uaeinteract.com/history/e_walk/con_3/con3_31.asp
 https://web.archive.org/web/20160303195805/http://www.muslimaccess.com/sunnah/seerah/1.htm
 https://wilderness-ventures-egypt.com/arrival-of-bedouin-tribes-in-sinai/
 https://nabataea.net/explore/cities_and_sites/nabataean-cities-in-the-negev/
 Montgomery-Massingberd, Hugh (1977). Burke's Royal Families of the World: Africa & the Middle East. Burke's Peerage. p. 32. ISBN 978-0-850-11029-6.
 https://www.royalark.net/Egypt/egypt6.htm

 
Tribes of Arabia
Yemeni tribes